Machon (Ancient Greek: Μάχων, fl. 3rd century BC) was a playwright of the New Comedy.

He was born in Corinth or Sicyon, and lived in Alexandria. It is said that he taught the grammarian Aristophanes of Byzantium. Two fragments from two of his plays, Agnoia (Ignorance) and Epistole (The Letter), survive, along with 462 verses from a book of anecdotes about the words and deeds of notorious Athenians, preserved in the Deipnosophistae of Athenaeus.  Dioscorides wrote an epitaph for Machon that has also survived.

References

 A. S. F. Gow, Machon: The Fragments (Cambridge, 1965) hardback , paperback 
info online
 Rudolf Kassel and Colin Austin, Poetae Comici Graeci, vol. V, pp. 623--5 (the two comic fragments, XIX and XX in Gow)
 Harry Thurston Peck, Harpers Dictionary of Classical Antiquities (1898).Machon

Ancient Greek dramatists and playwrights
Ancient Corinthians
Ancient Sicyonians
Ptolemaic court
New Comic poets
3rd-century BC Greek people